Aaron Hobart (June 26, 1787 – September 19, 1858) was a U.S. Representative from Massachusetts.   Born in Abington, Massachusetts, Hobart pursued classical studies and graduated from Brown University in 1805.  He studied law, was admitted to the bar and commenced practice in Abington.  He served as member of the Massachusetts House of Representatives and served in the Massachusetts State Senate.

Hobart was elected as a Democratic-Republican to the Sixteenth Congress to fill the vacancy caused by the resignation of Zabdiel Sampson.  He was reelected as a Democratic-Republican to the Seventeenth Congress, elected as an Adams-Clay Republican to the Eighteenth Congress, and reelected as an Adams candidate to the Nineteenth Congress, and served from November 24, 1820, to March 3, 1827.

He declined to be a candidate for renomination in 1826.  He then served as an Executive councilor 1827-1831 and served as probate judge 1843-1858.  He died in East Bridgewater, Massachusetts, September 19, 1858, and was interred in Central Cemetery.

References

1787 births
1858 deaths
Brown University alumni
Massachusetts state senators
Members of the Massachusetts House of Representatives
Massachusetts state court judges
People from Abington, Massachusetts
Democratic-Republican Party members of the United States House of Representatives from Massachusetts
National Republican Party members of the United States House of Representatives
19th-century American politicians
19th-century American judges